Swanston is a side-platformed Sacramento RT light rail station between Arden Way and El Camino Avenue, just west of the Capital City Freeway, in Sacramento, California, United States. The station was opened on March 12, 1987, and is operated by the Sacramento Regional Transit District as part of the Blue Line. The station is named for the Swanston Heights neighborhood of the city, which is served by the stop.

Platforms and tracks

References

External links
 

Sacramento Regional Transit light rail stations
Railway stations in the United States opened in 1987
1987 establishments in California